Rafael Aguilar Talamantes (October 24, 1939 in Santa Rosalía, Baja California Sur – July 17, 2016 in Ciudad de México, México) was a Mexican politician.

Talamantes graduated from the National School of Economics at the National Autonomous University of Mexico (UNAM) in 1962 where he attended from 1958. He returned to UNAM in 1971 to the National School of Law where he attended until 1976, leaving without completing his degree. Originally a member of the Mexican Communist Party, he became a political prisoner in 1966 apprehended in the Universidad Michoacana de San Nicolás de Hidalgo in Michoacán on October 8 of that year. Talamantes was imprisoned on charges of property damage to the nation.

CNAO foundation
In 1970, Talamantes was released from prison due to the law of social dissolution being repealed by then president Gustavo Díaz Ordaz, many other student protesters were among those released. Aguilar soon after left the Mexican Communist Party, claiming the party had done nothing to get him out of prison. Talamantes along with other prominent members of the student movement, as well as members of the Marxist leftist movement, the Movement of National Liberation (MLN), formed the Comité Nacional de Auscultación y Organización (CNAO) in 1971. The organization however suffered a split between those that wanted to adopt Marxism–Leninism ideology and those that wanted to adopt a party language more in line with what they felt was the voice of the Mexican people. Demetrio Vallejo and Heberto Castillo split to form the Mexican Workers' Party (PMT), Rafael Aguilar Talamantes, along with Graco Ramírez, formed the Socialist Workers' Party PST.

Partido Socialista de los Trabajadores
The PST was founded as a Marxist political party that believed in the expropriation of financial institutions and many industries, also believing management of state enterprises should be handled by the workers and peasants. The PST secured registration in 1978 and in the following year it was given proportional representation seats, continuing to win 9-12 seats the following periods in 1982 and '85. In 1987 the PST split again as Graco Ramírez was expelled from the party, often cited as differences over the direction the party was taking. In 1988, after having served as the party Secretary General from 1975 to '76 and President from 79-87, the party was renamed to the Party of the Cardenist Front of National Reconstruction (PFCRN). In 1987 the PFCRN allied itself with the National Democratic Front, which supported the candidacy of Cuauhtémoc Cárdenas Solórzano, a former PRI member who had left the party and was running for the presidency supported by a large number of leftist parties and organizations. Cárdenas lost the election to PRI candidate Carlos Salinas de Gortari, it is believed after massive election fraud. After the elections of 1988, Aguilar Talamantes separated from the FDN, and the PFCRN supported many of the policies of the ex-president Carlos Salinas de Gortari. In 1988 the party proportional representation in Congress rose from 12 seats to 41.

In the elections of 1994 Aguilar Talamantes was the PFCRN candidate to the Presidency, but obtained only 0.85% of the vote, with which it was in sixth place. His party lost its official recognition, recovered it as the Cardenist Party in 1997, but that same year would lose its registry definitively.

At the moment, Aguilar Talamantes one has seen near the Socialdemocratic Party (formerly known as Social Democratic Alternative Party), he supported the candidacy of Patricia Mercado in the presidential elections of the 2006.

See also
List of political parties in Mexico

References
Political Parties of the Americas, 1980s to 1990s: Canada, Latin America, and the West Indies By Charles D. Ameringer. Published by Greenwood Publishing Group, 1992. .
Taking On Goliath: The Emergence Of A New Left Party And The Struggle For Democracy In Mexico By Kathleen Bruhn. Published by Penn State Press, 2004. .
Mexican Political Biographies, 1935-1993 By Roderic Ai Camp. Published by University of Texas Press, 1995. .

1939 births
2016 deaths
Members of the Chamber of Deputies (Mexico)
Candidates in the 1994 Mexican presidential election
National Autonomous University of Mexico alumni
Politicians from Baja California Sur
Mexican Communist Party politicians
Party of the Cardenist Front of National Reconstruction politicians
People from Santa Rosalía, Baja California Sur
20th-century Mexican politicians